Special is the third studio album by American R&B singer Vesta Williams, released on A&M Records on August 21, 1991.

Commercial performance
The album peaked to number 15 on Billboards Top R&B Albums chart. William's scored her biggest charting R&B hit with the lead single, "Special", peaking at number two on Billboards Top R&B Singles chart.

Track listing

Charts

Weekly charts

Year-end charts

Singles

References

External links
 

1991 albums
Vesta Williams albums
A&M Records albums